Charnwood is a constituency in Leicestershire represented in the House of Commons of the UK Parliament since 2015 by Edward Argar, a Conservative.

Constituency profile
The seat emerged from the Boundary Commission report of 1995 reflecting population increases in Leicestershire for the 1997 general election; the largest part of it was previously in Loughborough.  To date Charnwood has been a Conservative Party stronghold.

It mostly comprises affluent commuter villages to the north of Leicester and south of Loughborough; its residents are slightly wealthier than the UK average.

Boundaries
1997–2010: The Borough of Charnwood wards of Birstall Goscote, Birstall Greengate, Birstall Netherhall, Birstall Riverside, Birstall Stonehill, Bradgate, East Goscote, Mountsorrel and Rothley, Queniborough, Six Hills, Syston, Thurcaston, Thurmaston, Woodhouse and Swithland, the District of Blaby wards of Ellis, Fairestone, Kirby, Leicester Forest East, the Borough of Hinckley and Bosworth wards of Groby and Ratby.

2010–present: The Borough of Charnwood wards of Anstey, Birstall Wanlip, Birstall Watermead, East Goscote, Forest Bradgate, Mountsorrel, Queniborough, Rothley and Thurcaston, Syston East, Syston West, Thurmaston, Wreake Villages, the District of Blaby wards of Ellis, Fairestone, Forest, Muxloe, the Borough of Hinckley and Bosworth ward of Groby.

The seat is close to Leicester, between the city and Nottingham; it covers slightly more than half of the local government district of Charnwood to the north of Leicester. The town of Loughborough is the largest in the borough, but lies in a separate constituency.

Members of Parliament

Elections

Elections in the 2010s

Elections in the 2000s

Elections in the 1990s

See also
 List of parliamentary constituencies in Leicestershire and Rutland

Notes

References

External links 
Large printable map showing roads and constituency boundary (Walkingclub.org)
nomis Constituency Profile for Charnwood — presenting data from the ONS annual population survey and other official statistics.

Parliamentary constituencies in Leicestershire
Constituencies of the Parliament of the United Kingdom established in 1997